Gilberto Jiménez Narváez (February 18, 1937 – October 20, 2015) was a Roman Catholic bishop.

Ordained to the priesthood in 1963, he was appointed bishop of the Roman Catholic Diocese of Riohacha, Colombia in 1996 and then auxiliary bishop of the Archdiocese of Medellin in 2001 retiring in 2012.

Notes

1937 births
2015 deaths
21st-century Roman Catholic bishops in Colombia
20th-century Roman Catholic bishops in Colombia
Roman Catholic bishops of Riohacha
Roman Catholic bishops of Medellín